South Killingholme is a village and civil parish in North Lincolnshire, England. The population of the civil parish at the 2011 census was 1,108.

The parish was predominately agricultural and sparsely populated and the village small until the 1960s when industrialisation of the south Humber bank took place throughout area north-west of Grimsby – within the parish of South Killingholme the Humber Oil Refinery was built in the  late 1960s. At the same time the village greatly expanded reaching near its present (2006) scale by the early 1970s.

The expansion of the Port of Immingham westwards encroached on the parish from the 1970s onwards, mainly due to the Immingham Bulk Terminal (1970) and later Immingham Gas Jetty (1985); in 2004 a 730 MW powerstation Conoco Philips Power Station (now known as Immingham Power Station) was built alongside the refinery.

As of 2006 the land area of the parish consists of an approximately 50:50 split of heavy industry – petroleum storage, refining and power generation; and agricultural land. South Killingholme is the only village in the parish and is located roughly in the centre of area.

Geography

The parish had a population of 1,047 at the 2001 census, and at the 2011 census a population of 1,108. The parish is in the Ferry ward of North Lincolnshire.

The southeastern and southern sides of the parish forms a boundary with the parishes of Immingham and Habrough and with the administrative county of North East Lincolnshire, following the line of the main drain leading to South Killingholme Haven. The northwestern boundary is entirely with the parish of North Killingholme, running southeast–northwest; from the southern part along the West Mere Middle Road, then bisecting the Lindsey Oil Refinery, and exiting the bank of the Humber Estuary halfway between north and south Killingholme havens.

Half of the parish is in agricultural use, primarily farming but including some plantations, the land is drained by man made ditches. The only human habitation in the parish of any note is the village of South Killingholme, near to the centre of the  parish.

The remainder of the parish is used for industrial and logistical purposes – northeast of the village is the Humber Oil Refinery, with the Lindsey Oil Refinery to the north also partially in the parish. Near the banks of the Humber the development of the Port of Immingham estate extends into the parish, specifically the western part of the Immingham Bulk Terminal, known as the Humber International Terminal; and the Immingham Gas Terminal; the freight branch line to the docks (formerly the Humber Commercial Railway) runs through the parish from a junction near Ulceby station. To the northwest along the banks is the Killingholme gas jetty, and an associated storage facility. Three lighthouses, all constructed in the 19th century, are located on the Humber bank near to the oil storage terminal.

The A1077 / A160 passes through the parish from a junction with the A180 passing through the village, and connecting to Immingham Dock.

Lighthouses

Three lighthouses were built on the Humber bank during the 19th century :  Killingholme High (1831, rebuilt 1876), and Killingholme South Low lighthouses (1836), were used together to guide ships on the Humber to the south; whilst Killingholme High and Killingholme North Low (1851), were used together to guide ships on the Humber to the north. The North Low Light has been inactive since 1920.

Also in use on the Humber banks at the beginning of the 20th century were brick works northwest of South Killingholme Haven.

History

There is archaeological (cropmark) evidence of human activity near to the present village to at least the Iron Age/Roman Britain period, with cropmark evidence of activity continuing into the medieval period. It is thought there was once a moated manor at South Killingholme, north of the modern village, dating to the Norman period or earlier, no remnants of the site remain.
The name Killingholme is Swedish and translates into 'Goat kid islet'. There are numerous 'Killingholme' and 'Killingholmen' in Sweden, as well as in Finland (which for 700 years was part of Sweden).
A remnant of the early village is "The Nook", a timber-framed house dating to the 17th century or earlier, close to the church.

A baptist chapel was built in 1747, and was reconstructed 1792 (now listed).

By 1886 the village had a school, post office, Methodist chapels and consisted of around twenty dwellings scattered mostly along Greengate Road, Town Street and School Road. By the turn of the 20th century the Cross Keys Inn had been built west of the traditional village centre, and by the 1930s a limited amount, less than 20 dwellings, of additional housing had been built.

By 1872 the population of South Killingholme was 574, approximately triple that of North Killingholme. In addition to a Baptist chapel, there were now Wesleyan and Primitive Methodist chapels in the village.

The Barton and Immingham Line connected to the Humber Commercial Railway which also ran through the parish – both were built as part of the development of the Immingham Dock.

By 1930 a fish meal and oil works had been built between the lights and brickworks, with its own jetty onto the Humber. Both the fish and brick works were rail connected to the new light railway. Additionally some terraced housing was built, Marsh Row, near Marsh farm on Marsh Lane, southeast of the fish meal works. No significant developments took place in the parish from the 1930s to the Second World War, and through the 1940s and 1950s.

During the 1960s the area experienced large scale industrial development, primarily the Humber Refinery, developed by Continental Oil (see Industry of the South Humber Bank.) The road network was greatly developed, with existing roads (A160) widened; sidings from the former Humber Commercial railway were built for the oil refineries. On the banks of the Humber the fish meal and brick works became defunct – a jetty for hydrocarbon import was built, the Killingholme Gas Jetty, with an associated storage facility, in the environs of the lighthouses. Services on the Barton to Immingham Line ended in 1963.

At the same time as the industrial expansion the village of South Killingholme grew greatly. By the mid-1960s the number of houses in the village had multiplied, with houses built along Greengate Lane, Town Street, Top Road and elsewhere. By the beginning of the 1970s the area bounded by Greengate Lane, Top Road and School Road, and Town Street had been filled with housing development, with new estates and roads to the north of Greengate Lane (St Deny's Road). Housing development then stablished, excluding further houses built on Lancaster Road, with no further major development to 2006.

Expansion of the Port of Immingham led to some storage facilities of the Immingham Bulk Terminal  being built west of South Killingholme Haven (1970) within the parish. Another gas jetty, Immingham Gas Jetty, was built between the existing jetty and bulk terminal. In the first decade of the 21st century the bulk terminal was substantially expanded westwards into the parish; the new facility being known as the Humber International Terminal.

The South Killingholme area was struck by an F1/T3 tornado on 23 November 1981, as part of the record-breaking nationwide tornado outbreak on that day.

In 2004 ConocoPhillips constructed a 730 MW power station (Conoco Philips Power Station, also known as Immingham Power Station) adjacent to their Humber Refinery. In 2005 the same company established a wood "Mayflower Wood" – a  area was planted with over 60,000 trees and shrubs. In 2009 the power station was expanded, increasing output to 1,180 MW.

In 2015 construction work on the "A160/A180 Port of Immingham Improvement" road improvement scheme was begun. The road improvement scheme was intended to convert the A160 from single to dual carriage way, with new junctions onto the A180 and A1173; as part of the scheme access from one side of South Killingholme to the other across the A160 was to be ended and replaced with a road bridge on Town Street over the dual carriageway.

See also
North Killingholme

References

Map locations and landmarks

Sources

, An Act to empower the Central Oil Refining Company Limited to construct works and to acquire lands; and for other purposes.

External links

Villages in the Borough of North Lincolnshire
Civil parishes in Lincolnshire
Nature reserves in Lincolnshire